Menrva (also spelled Menerva or Menfra) was an Etruscan goddess of war, art, wisdom, and medicine. She contributed much of her character to the Roman Minerva. She was the child of Uni and Tinia.

Although Menrva was seen by Hellenized Etruscans as their counterpart to Greek Athena, Menrva has some unique traits that make it clear that she was not an import from Greece. Etruscan artists under the influence of Greek culture, however, liked to portray Menrva with Gorgoneion, helmet, spear, and shield, and, on one mirrorback, as bursting from the head of her father, Tinia. Also, she commonly is seen as the protector of Hercle (Heracles) and Pherse (Perseus). On a bronze mirror found at Praeneste, she attends Perseus, who consults two Graeae, and, on another, holds high the head of Medusa, while she and seated Perseus and Hermes all gaze safely at its reflection in a pool at their feet. These images are more likely to reflect literary sources than any cult practice. On a bronze mirror from Bolsena, c. 300 BCE, she is portrayed attending a scene of Prometheus Unbound with Esplace (Asclepius), who bandages Prometheus' chest.

Often, Menrva is depicted in a more essentially Etruscan style, as a lightning thrower. Martianus mentions her as one of nine Etruscan lightning deities. Depiction with a thunderbolt may be seen on later Roman coins of Minerva as well.

Menrva seems to have been associated with weather phenomena. The Greeks never attributed an association with weather to Athena, making this another important difference between the two religious cults that demonstrates their separate characteristics.

Menrva's name is indigenous to Italy and might even be of Etruscan origin, stemming from an Italic moon goddess, *Meneswā 'She who measures'. It is thought that the Etruscans adopted the inherited Old Latin name, *Menerwā, thereby calling her Menrva. However, this has been disputed. Carl Becker suggests that her name appears to contain the PIE root *men-, which he notes was linked in Greek primarily to memory words (cf. Greek "mnestis"/μνῆστις 'memory, remembrance, recollection'), but which more generally referred to 'mind' in most Indo-European languages.

Menrva often was depicted in the Judgement of Paris, called Elcsntre (Alexander, his alternative name in Greek) in Etruscan, one of the most popular Greek myths in Etruria.

Menrva was part of a triple deity with Uni and Tinia, later reflected in the Roman Capitoline Triad of Juno, Jupiter, and Minerva.

References

External links

Arts goddesses
Etruscan goddesses
Etruscan religion
Health goddesses
War goddesses
Wisdom goddesses
Thunder goddesses
Minerva